is a 2022 Japanese television drama series starring Yukino Kishii and Issey Takahashi. The series revolves around the relationship of two aromantic asexual people.

Cast
Yukino Kishii as Sakuko Kodama
Issey Takahashi as Satoru Takahashi
Shogo Hama as Matsuoka Hajime
Fujiko Kojima as Chizuru Kadowaki
Akiko Kikuchi as Haruka Inozuka
Kana Kita as Minori Ishikawa
Hidenobu Abera as Daisuke Ishikawa
Naomi Nishida as Sakura Kodama
Mantaro Koichi as Hiromi Kodama

Production
Koisenu Futari was produced under NHK and had three directors; Yudai Noguchi (episodes 2, 5, and 8), Yuta Oshida (episodes 1, 4, and 7), and Shohei Doi (episodes 3 and 6).

Development
Co-director Yuta Oshida came up with the idea for the story of Koisenu Futari after coming to the realization that Japanese television dramas often include romantic relationships and elements. This led to him learning about asexuality, with his research including interviewing asexual people. NHK staffers initially expressed skepticism when he pitched the show in May 2021, but ultimately they agreed that the show could work despite the lack of public knowledge about aromanticism and asexuality.

Music
Umitaro Abe provided the musical score for Koisenu Futari. The theme song for the television series  by the pop band Chai.

Broadcast
Koisenu Futari premiered on NHK on 10 January 2022. It had eight episodes, with the last episode broadcast on 21 March 2022.

Episodes

External links
Koisenu Futari official microsite at NHK (in Japanese)

References

NHK original programming
2022 Japanese television series debuts
2022 Japanese television series endings
Japanese drama television series
Asexuality in fiction